Cataglyphis hannae is a species of ant in the subfamily Formicinae. It is native to Tunisia.

References

Formicinae
Hymenoptera of Africa
Insects of North Africa
Insects described in 1994
Taxonomy articles created by Polbot